Dominick Ronanye (1790 – 14 January 1836) was an Irish politician.

Ronanye lived at Ringvine in County Waterford, and was a cousin of Daniel O'Connell.  He served as a barrister.  He stood in Dungarvan at the 1830 UK general election, but most of his voters were disallowed as they had instead registered in the County Waterford constituency, and he lost by 350 votes to 50.

At the 1832 UK general election, he stood in Clonmel and was elected for the Repeal Association.  He was re-elected as the 1835 UK general election as a Whig, but died in January 1836, still in office.

References

1790 births
1836 deaths
Irish barristers
Irish Repeal Association MPs
Members of the Parliament of the United Kingdom for County Tipperary constituencies (1801–1922)
People from County Waterford
UK MPs 1832–1835
UK MPs 1835–1837
Whig (British political party) MPs for Irish constituencies